Martina Di Giuseppe and Giulia Gatto-Monticone were the defending champions having won the previous edition in 2019, but chose not to participate.

Estelle Cascino and Jessika Ponchet won the title, defeating Eden Silva and Kimberley Zimmermann in the final, 0–6, 7–5, [10–7].

Seeds

Draw

Draw

References
Main Draw

Engie Open Saint-Gaudens Occitanie - Doubles